Trafalgar Hospital was a "145-bed private nonprofit institution" at 161 East 90th Street in Manhattan. By late 1978 the hospital, after facing regulatory and financial difficulties, had closed, and the 9-story 1926-built building was in the process of being converted to co-op apartments.

The building, pre-Trafalgar, housed three other hospitals, including the Pan American Hospital in the 1920s.

By 1966 Trafalgar had replaced both coal and oil heating for gas: a one-time expenditure of $20,000 saved $12,000 per year.

References

External links
 1930s use of Trafalga's 161 East 90th Street building

Defunct hospitals in Manhattan